Mir Jumla II (1591 – 30 March 1663) was a prominent subahdar of Bengal under the Mughal Emperor Aurangzeb.

Early life
Mir Jumla was born as Mir Mohammad Sayyid Ardistani in Iran in 1591 to a poor oil merchant of Isfahan named Mirza Hazaru. Although his parents were extremely poor, he had the opportunity to learn letters which probably lead him to find a job as a clerk under a diamond merchant who had connections with the Kingdom of Golkonda. (present day Hyderabad). The region was famous for its diamond mines. Later he came to Golconda as early as before 1630. He emigrated to Golconda due to the financial debts exacted upon him by one Sheikh ul Islam and general misgovernance in his country.</blockquote>

In 1653, Rustam Beg a Havildar under Mir Jumla demolished the upper part of the temple at Poonamallee and erected a mosque over it. Based on this Sita Ram Goel has listed the Poonamallee mosque along with other mosques built from materials of Hindu temples in his Hindu Temples What Happened to them?. Even Islamic scholar Richard M. Eaton in his thesis on temple desecration also lists this temple as the part of desecration of temples during Islamic rule .

He was also a good financier. He employed Telugu Niyogi Brāhmaṇas to collect revenue. He was able to collect 43 lakhs of Rupees from his domains which were rich in Diamonds, Iron, Saltpetre and Steel.By his enormous wealth, he was able to recruit Pathans, Rajputs, Afghans and Mughals in his campaign to Bijapur in 1652. In 1653-1654, in one of Aurengzeb's letters to Shah Jahan, Aurengzeb cites a report of his agent Mohammad Amin where Mir Jumla is said to have maintained a force of 9000 Cavalry , 20000 infantry and his army filled with Iraqi and Arabi horses

Mughal maritime trade 
Mir Jumla had his own ships and organised merchant fleets in the 1640s that sailed throughout Surat, Thatta, Arakan, Ayuthya, Balasore, Aceh, Melaka, Johore, Bantam, Makassar, Ceylon, Bandar Abbas, Mecca, Jeddah, Basra, Aden, Masqat, Mocha and the Maldives.

Career in the Mughal Imperial Court

Estrangement from Golconda
With the governorship of the Karnataka domains , Mir Jumla exponentially transformed from a wazir of a powerless master to a position of unchecked power and wealth. Naturally many officers in the Qutub Shahi court felt jealous of him and they naturally positioned the mind of the sultan against the Wazir. Already the Sultan suspected Mir Jumla of collusion with Bijapuri officers in Gandikota as the Adil Shāhis transferred the fort only in the name of the Wazir. So the sultan demanded a portion of loot obtained by Mir Jumla in the karnatak which Mir Jumla flatly refused as he thought that the conquest was solely his work and the sultan had no part to take it.

After having tasted regal independence in Karnataka, he was loth to return to the life of a courtier. But he could not long disobey the summons of his master. So, he once went back to Golconda. The Sultan conspired with other courtiers to seize and blind him, but Mir Jumla learnt of the plot before it was matured, and cleverly managed to escape to the Karnatak, vowing never to visit Golconda again. The Sultan kept calling him back with increasing persistence, but it only served to confirm Mir Jumla’s suspicion. At last the mask was thrown away, and he began to look for other options of service.

Mir Jumla had also begun to coquet with the Mughal power . Prince Aurangzeb, secretly nursing his passionate ambition of conquering the rich State of Golconda, was eager to secure such an able helper and counsellor as the prime-minister of that kingdom. Through the Mughal envoy at Golconda the prince opened a secret correspondence with Mir Jumla, promising him not only protection for his family and property against his  master, but also boundless favour from the Emperor, if he joined the Mughal service. He also sent an agent, Muhammad Mumin, directly to the independent Wazir. But the prudent wazir dallied with the offer and waited to see what turn his affairs would take. So, he sent a secret petition for appointment under the Emperor, in order to ascertain what terms he might expect from that quarter.

For some time Shah Jahan wasn't willing to accept Mir Jumla but at last, yielding to Aurangzeb’s importunity, the Emperor offered to Mir Jumla his protection and favour if he came to his Court. But evidently the terms were very vague, and Mir Jumla was in no haste to accept them. He, however, feigned consent, and begged a year’s respite in which to collect his property from the ports, and keep his promise to Qutb Shah. So, he urged the Mughal Court to keep this agreement secret till then, for if the Deccani Sultans discovered his successful plot. Evidently Aurangzeb’s solicitations ceased, or his agent at Golconda blundered and the secret of Mir Jumla’s understanding with the Emperor leaked out. The two Deccani Sultans, agreed to unite their forces to crush him. It was now Mir Jumla’s turn to be as eager as he had been lukewarm before in joining the Mughals. His son Muhammad Amin, who wasn't wise with his own words,led to his own imprisonment for insulting the Qutub Shah.  This made Mir Jumla accept Mughal hegemony and wrote to the prince agreeing to join the Mughal service.

On his accession to the throne, Aurangzeb entrusted Mir Jumla with the task of dealing with Shah Shuja. Shuja was Aurangzeb's brother and a contender to the Mughal throne. He was defeated in the Battle of Khajwa and took to flight. Mir Jumla pursued Shuja from Khajwa to Tanda and from Tanda to Dhaka (capital of the present day Bangladesh), where he arrived on 9 May 1660. The latter, however, had already left Dhaka, crossed the eastern border and ultimately found shelter with the king of Arakan (modern day Myanmar).

Soon after his arrival at Dhaka, Mir Jumla received the imperial farman (decree) appointing him subahdar (governor) of Bengal. The emperor, in recognition of his services, honoured Mir Jumla with titles, rewards and increment of mansab (rank). He at once began reorganising the administration, which had become slack in the absence of Shuja during the war of succession, and disobedience and refractoriness had become prevalent. Reversing the action of Shuja who had transferred the capital to Rajmahal, he restored Dhaka to its former glory. He then paid attention to the administration of justice, dismissed dishonest Qazis (clerics and judges) and Mir Adils and replaced them with honest persons. According to Niccolai Manucci, Shuja fled back to Tripura with his surviving middle son Buland Akhtar whom Tripura king Nakshatra Roy alias Chhatra Narayan helped to reach Manipur by supplying elephants and a few guards for fear of Aurangzeb's pursuing army and informers. Shuja reached ultimately Manipur (Mekhli) in 1662 starting from Dacca in 1660 via Arakan and Tripura, according to Dr. John Peter Wade (An Account of Assam, 1800, p. 297). Manipur king Khunjaoba received him in 1662 and kept him secret of his identity and also Aurangzeb sent a three-man embassy (Ahaddis) to Manipur regarding the matter and Manipur king too reciprocated with a three-man embassy to the Mughal Court (A. Hakim Shah Khullakpam, 2008, The Manipur Governance To the Meitei Pangal or Manipuri Muslims, Imphal: Pearl, p. 56).
Shuja was hiding for sometime in Shujalok (Kairang in east of Imphal of Manipur) and in Ukhrul hill of the present state, and returned to the valley in 1679 (R.K. Sanahal Singh, 1989, Pangal Thorakpa, Imphal: Liberty Publication). Since Shuja arrived on elephant supplied by Tripura king, he was also known as Shuna-i-pil (Sunarphul), meaning "officer-in-charge of elephants", among Manipuri annalists and in the puya, Nongsamei.(Ibid). He died sometime in 1691 and was buried at Shujalok (Janab Khan, 1972, Manipuri Muslims, Imphal: Shanti Press). (see also: How Shuja, Brother of Aurangzeb Died at Ukhrul (sic); Manipuri Muslims Socially Speaking).

Mir Jumla's construction activities in Dhaka and its suburbs resulted in two roads, two bridges and a network of forts, which were necessary for public welfare, strategic purposes, and speedy dispatch of troops, equipment and ammunition. A fort at Tangi-Jamalpur guarded one of the roads connecting Dhaka with the northern districts; it is now known as the Mymensingh Road. The other road led eastward, connecting the capital city with Fatulla (old Dhapa), where there were two forts, and by extension the road could lead up to Khizrpur where two other forts were situated. The Pagla bridge lies on this road off Fatulla. Some parts of the roads and forts built by Mir Jumla are still extant.

Northeastern frontier expedition

The most important aspect of Mir Jumla's rule in Bengal was his northeastern frontier policy, by which he conquered the frontier kingdoms of Kamrup (Kamarupa) and Assam. Koch Behar was a vassal state, but Raja Pran Narayan took advantage of the war of succession and shook off his allegiance. The Ahom king of Assam, Jayadhwaj Singha, occupied a part of Kamrup, which had earlier been integrated with the Bengal subah.

Mir Jumla advanced with a large army and navy against the enemy; he sent the main body of the troops and the navy towards Kamrup, while he himself proceeded against Koch Behar. On his approach, Pran Narayan evacuated the country and fled towards the hills. Koch Behar was occupied in about one month and a half and making administrative arrangements there, Mir Jumla came to join the advance party towards Kamrup.

The king of Assam was prudent enough to evacuate Kamrup, but Mir Jumla decided to conquer Assam also. Mir Jumla took 12,000 cavalry, 30,000 infantry, and a fleet of 323 ships and boats up river towards Assam—the naval contingent comprised Portuguese, English, and Dutch sailors.

An account of the campaign and the life during the times was presented by the Venetian adventurer Niccolao Manucci in his memoirs Storia do Mogor. This book was a reference for the work of the French historian François Catrou who wrote the 'Histoire Générale de l'Empire du Mogol' in 1715. Manucci also got acquainted with a Mughal Navy officer of British descent during the same period named Thomas Pratte. Pratte was appointed by Mir Jumla as an officer in the Mughal navy and used to collect war boats and procure gunpowder necessary for naval warfare.

Assam, in those days, was a big country and its physiography was much different from that of Bengal. But nothing daunted Mir Jumla. In less than six weeks' time, since his starting from Guwahati, Mir Jumla conquered up to Garhgaon, the capital of Assam.

Jungle warfare and counter-insurgency campaign
Beyond that the country was full of high hills and mountains, inaccessible for horses and troops, where the Ahom king took shelter. During the rains, the Mughals were locked in a few raised grounds, the roads were submerged, the streams and even the Nalahs (drains) swelled up to become big rivers..

Many armies would have disintegrated under these circumstances but under Mir Jumla's magnificent leadership, the Mughal army held firm and remained on the offensive. But, the Mughals lost two thirds of the army due to lack of food and relentless attacks by Assamese shart shooters at night.

After the rains were over, both Mir Jumla and the king of Assam agreed to sign a peace treaty. The terms of treaty implied that the Ahom king or Swargadeo would accept Mughal rule and both the Swargadeo and the Tipam king would offer their daughters to the Mughal harem (The Ahom princess was Ramani Gabharu, the sole daughter of the then Swargadeo, Jayadhwaj Singha. She later became the daughter-in-law of Emperor Aurangzeb as Rahmat Banu Begum). The Ahoms also had to pay a war indemnity and an annual tribute of 20 elephants. They also had to cede the western half of their kingdom from Guwahati to Manas river.

Death and legacy
Mir Jumla died on his way back from the Assamese territory on 30 March 1663. His tomb located on a small hillock at Mankachar, Assam has been maintained over the centuries. It is near Garo Hills in the northeastern Indian state of Meghalaya. The tomb reflects a remarkably long grave and bears testimony to the tall height of Mir Jumla. There are two more unidentified graves beside the tomb of Mir Jumla said to be of two Pirs, i. e. of religious preacher of Central Asian origin.

See also
 Hyderabadi Muslims
 Muslim culture of Hyderabad
 History of Hyderabad
 Mughal empire
 Emperor of India
 List of rulers of Bengal
 History of Bengal

Notes

The fantastic Mri Jumla by Akshay Cavan, 2017

References
 
 
 
 Atan Buragohain and his times: A history of Assam, from the invasion of Nawab Mir Jumla in 1662–63, to the termination of Assam-Mogul conflicts in 1682 by Surya Kumar Bhuyan 
 

 The Mughal Throne: The Saga of India's Great Emperors by Abraham Eraly 
 The Mughal Nobility Under Aurangzeb by M. Athar Ali 

1591 births
1663 deaths
Mughal generals
Islamic rule in the Indian subcontinent
History of Andhra Pradesh
Telugu people
Subahdars of Bengal